The 1999 Rebellion was the inaugural Rebellion professional wrestling pay-per-view event produced by the American promotion, World Wrestling Federation (WWF, now WWE). It took place on October 2, 1999, at the National Indoor Arena in Birmingham, England. The event was broadcast exclusively in the United Kingdom.

Production

Background
In May 1999, the American professional wrestling promotion World Wrestling Federation (WWF, now WWE) held a pay-per-view (PPV) called No Mercy, which was held in and broadcast exclusively for the United Kingdom. Later that year, the promotion announced that they would be holding another United Kingdom-exclusive event titled Rebellion. It was scheduled to be held on October 2, 1999, at the National Indoor Arena in Birmingham, England.

Storylines
The event featured eleven professional wrestling matches and two pre-show matches that involved different wrestlers from pre-existing scripted feuds and storylines. Wrestlers portrayed villains, heroes, or less distinguishable characters in the scripted events that built tension and culminated in a wrestling match or series of matches.

Event

Prior to the start of the event, Christian defeated Crash Holly, in a dark match.

The first match saw WWF Intercontinental Champion Jeff Jarrett take on European Champion D'Lo Brown. Prior to the start of the match a coin toss was used to determine which championship would be on the line. Ultimately it was determined that the Intercontinental Championship was on the line, in a match which saw Jarrett retain his title.

The second match saw The Godfather defeat Gangrel, following a Pimp Drop. After the match, The Godfather convinced referee Tim White to dance with him and the hoes.

Prior to the next match, it was announced that the WWE would be hosting another UK exclusive pay-per-view on May 6, 2000 which would be the inaugural Insurrextion.

Next Val Venis defeated Mark Henry following the Money Shot.

In a backstage segment The British Bulldog angrily confronted Vince McMahon and Shane McMahon about not getting a WWF title shot in his home country and, in his anger, threw a garbage can across the room, which accidentally hit Stephanie McMahon.

The WWF Women's Championship match was next, in a Four Corners match. During this match Ivory defended her title against Jacqueline, Luna Vachon and Tori. Ivory successfully defended her title when she hit Jackie in the face with the belt.

Next Chris Jericho defeated Road Dogg following a low blow.

The following match was an intergender match, which saw Chyna take on Jeff Jarrett. After Chyna hit the pedigree on Jarrett, The British Bulldog interfered and clotheslined Chyna, resulting in her victory via disqualification. Following the match, the two continued their attack on Chyna, which concluded when Jarrett put Chyna in a figure-4.

The next match was a No Disqualification match between the Kane defeated Big Show. Kane ultimately picked up the victory when he kicked a chair into Big Show’s face followed by a bodyslam.

The following match saw The British Bulldog defeat X-Pac. This was followed by a triangle match which saw Edge and Christian defeat The Acolytes (Bradshaw and Faarooq) and The Hollys (Crash Holly and Hardcore Holly).

The main event was a Steel Cage match for the WWF Championship. This match saw the champion Triple H defend his title against The Rock. The British Bulldog came out during the match when The Rock was attempted to escape, knocking him down while trying to climb out. Chyna later came out and slammed the door on The Rock’s face when he went to escape. After Triple H escaped the cage, Vince McMahon came out and locked The British Bulldog in the cage in retribution for his attack on Stephanie McMahon earlier. The Rock attacked The British Bulldog before eventually leaving over the top of the cage.

Aftermath
The British Bulldog and Stephanie McMahon's (kayfabe) fiancée Test briefly feuded when as a result of Bulldog's attack on her, Stephanie forgot how she felt for Test. Stephanie McMahon's memory later recovered and the two attempted to marry on the November 29, 1999 episode of Raw, only for Triple H (who was feuding with Vince McMahon at the time) to reveal he had married Stephanie.

A second Rebellion event was held the following year, also in the United Kingdom, thus establishing Rebellion as an annual UK-exclusive PPV for the promotion. The event was discontinued after its 2002 event as the promotion started to broadcast Raw and SmackDown from the UK in 2004.

Reception
In 2008, J.D. Dunn of 411Mania gave the event a rating of 6.5 [Average], stating, "An interesting show because it had a storyline which ran through the PPV and actually led an angle in the regular continuity. The main event is good, as are the Jericho and Jarrett matches. Not a "must-buy" by any means, but it's a mildly diverting show.
Thumbs in the middle tilting up."

Results

See also

Professional wrestling in the United Kingdom

References

1999 in England
Events in Birmingham, West Midlands
Professional wrestling in England
October 1999 events in the United Kingdom
1999 WWF pay-per-view events
WWE Rebellion